Grandview Park, also referred to as Turtle Hill by local residents, is a small, elevated park in the Sunset District, San Francisco, California. It is surrounded by 14th and 15th Avenues, as well as Noriega Street.

Despite its small size,  or about the size of a city block, the park is important geologically and botanically and offers views of downtown San Francisco, Golden Gate Park, to the Pacific Ocean, the Marin headlands, and across to the Sutro Tower.

It is an outcrop of chert, which is part of the heterogeneous assemblage known as the Franciscan Formation, or Franciscan Assemblage, the primary geologic feature on which the city of San Francisco is founded, here covered with a thin layer of sand. It provides one of the last remaining habitats within the city for a number of native plants, including the endangered Franciscan wallflower and dune tansy, and also bush lupin, beach strawberry, bush monkey flower, and coyote bush. The hill is crowned with Monterey cypress trees.

Because of the fragility of the environment, visitors to the park are asked to keep to paths.

References

External links
 16th Avenue Tile Steps - Google Maps street view including mosaic stairway and view of ocean, Golden Gate Bridge
   

Parks in San Francisco
Hills of San Francisco
Sunset District, San Francisco